This is a list of British armed forces general officers who were killed or died while on active service during the French Revolutionary and Napoleonic Wars. This comprises the period of 1793–1815, and includes British general officers who were serving in the British Army or attached to the allied Portuguese Army. Officers of the rank of colonel are included if they were acting in the position of a general officer, that being a brigade or larger, at the time of their death, despite them not themselves being general officers. Officers are also included if they had recently left a command at the time of their death, and their active service was the cause of it.

The death and injury rate of senior officers fighting in the French Revolutionary and Napoleonic Wars was unusually high. General officers of the period regularly demonstrated their courage and served to the forefront in battles, placing themselves in positions of high jeopardy. Sanitary and living conditions on military campaigns in the period were also poor, leading to a number of general officers succumbing to illness and disease while on service. Historian Rory Muir contrasts this style of service for British general officers with that of their successors fighting in the First World War, saying that the added risks officers of the French Revolutionary and Napoleonic Wars put themselves in meant that their troops "never felt the alienation from their senior officers which developed during the First World War". The highest rate of death among general officers occurred during the Peninsular War, where fifteen per cent who served were killed, having a sixty per cent higher chance of dying than their junior officers.

Generals

Lieutenant-Generals

Major-Generals

Brigadier-Generals

Colonels

Notes and citations

Notes

Citations

References

 
 
 
 
 
 
 
 
 
 
 
 
 
 
 
 
 
 
 
 
 
 
 
 
 

British military personnel killed in the French Revolutionary Wars
British military personnel killed in action in the Napoleonic Wars
Lists of British military personnel
British general officers killed in the French Revolutionary and Napoleonic Wars